King's Cross St Pancras (also known as King's Cross & St Pancras International) is a London Underground station on Euston Road in the Borough of Camden, Central London. It serves King's Cross and  main line stations in fare zone 1, and is an interchange between six Underground lines. The station was one of the first to open on the network.

The station opened in 1863 as part of the Metropolitan Railway, subsequently catering for the Hammersmith & City and Circle lines. It was expanded in 1868 with the opening of the City Widened Lines, and the Northern and Piccadilly platforms opened in the early 20th century. During the 1930s and 1940s, the station was restructured and partially rebuilt to cater for expanded traffic. The Victoria line connection opened in 1968. The 1987 King's Cross fire that killed 31 people is one of the deadliest accidents to occur on the Underground and resulted in widespread safety improvements and changes throughout the network. The station was extensively rebuilt in the early 21st century to cater for Eurostar services that moved from Waterloo to St Pancras, reopening in 2007.

History 

The first underground station at King's Cross was planned in 1851, during construction of the mainline station. The intention was to connect the Great Western Railway (GWR) at Paddington with the Great Northern Railway (GNR) at King's Cross. The line was opened as part of the original section of the Metropolitan Railway (MR) on 10 January 1863. It was reorganised in August 1868 to accommodate the City Widened Lines which allowed GNR and Metropolitan traffic to run along the line simultaneously. The same year, the Metropolitan built a link to the newly opened  station.

The Great Northern, Piccadilly and Brompton Railway (GNP&BR, now part of the Piccadilly line) platforms opened with the rest of the line on 15 December 1906, while the City & South London Railway (C&SLR, now part of the Northern line) opened on 11 May 1907. In 1927, this part of the station was renamed as King's Cross for St Pancras.

In 1933, the station was formally renamed King's Cross St Pancras, except for the Metropolitan line station, which continued to use the old name until 16 October 1940, when it was also renamed. During this time, major rebuilding work took place, including a direct connection to St Pancras and a circular ticket hall. The main concourse opened on 18 June 1939, and the subway link to St Pancras opened two years later. The total cost of the work was £260,000.

The Metropolitan line platforms were closed between 16 October and 9 December 1940 due to bomb damage during the Blitz. Further bomb damage to the Metropolitan line platforms occurred on 9 March 1941 when a train, the station roof, the signal box and the platforms were damaged and two railway staff were killed. New sub-surface platforms had been under construction as part of the station improvements begun in the 1930s and these were opened in an unfinished condition on 14 March 1941  to the west. These were decorated with cream tiles featuring pale green edges. A subway was built between the sub-surface lines, running below Euston Road and joining with the tube lines, making interchanging between the various lines easier. The 1868 platforms later became  station.

The Victoria line platforms were opened on 1 December 1968 as part of the line's second phase from Highbury & Islington to Warren Street. Unlike some other interchange stations on the line, it was not possible to put the platforms on the same level with other lines. Two new escalators were constructed, connecting the Northern / Piccadilly ticket hall with an expanded concourse. A further subway and staircase connected the new platforms to this.

The station was refurbished in 1986, in conjunction with several others on the tube network. The Northern and Piccadilly platforms were decorated with multi-coloured tiles featuring the letters "K" and "X" by the artist Paul Huxley. These tiles were removed during the substantial upgrade and expansion of the station in the mid 2000s.

Fire 

The underground network had been at risk of fire since opening, and the limited amount of space and means of escape increased the possibility of fatalities. Following a serious fire at Finsbury Park in February 1976, staff had been trained to be alert for any possible causes of ignition or smouldering.

At around 7:30 p.m. on 18 November 1987, a passenger reported a small fire on the Northern / Piccadilly up escalator and alerted staff. The incident was judged as relatively minor, and the Fire Brigade arrived at 7:43 p.m. with four pumps and a ladder. By this time, the ticket hall had filled with smoke, trains passed through the station without stopping, and passengers were being evacuated. At around 7:45 p.m., a fireball erupted from the Northern / Piccadilly escalators and set the ticket hall ablaze. The fire burned for several hours and was not properly contained until around 1:46 a.m. the following morning. It killed 31 people, including a fire officer.

The then-unknown fire phenomenon of the trench effect made the fire develop upwards and finally caused it to explode into the station. As a result, fire safety procedures on the Underground were tightened, staff training was improved and wooden steps on escalators were replaced with metal ones. Smoking had already been banned on subsurface areas of the Underground in February 1985; following the King's Cross fire, it was banned throughout the entire network. The fire caused extensive damage, particularly to the old wooden escalators where it had started. Repairs and rebuilding took over a year; the Northern line platforms and the escalators from the ticket hall to the Piccadilly line remained closed until 5 March 1989.

Upgrade and expansion 

In the aftermath of the fire, the Fennell Report recommended that London Underground should investigate "passenger flow and congestion in stations and take remedial action". Consequently, a Parliamentary bill was tabled in 1993 to permit London Underground to improve and expand the congested station.

In August 2000, work began to upgrade and expand the station in conjunction with the Channel Tunnel Rail Link project, in which St Pancras would be the new terminal for Eurostar services to continental Europe. The upgrade took almost 10 years to complete at a cost of £810m, doubling the capacity of the station to more than 100,000 people daily. Two new ticket halls were built – the Western Ticket Hall under the forecourt of St Pancras station, and the Northern Ticket Hall under the new King's Cross station concourse. The existing ticket hall in front of King's Cross station was rebuilt and expanded. New passageways and escalators were provided to increase capacity, and ten new lifts were installed to make the station step-free. King's Cross Thameslink station closed on 9 December 2007 after the service moved to St Pancras.

The upgraded station was opened by the Mayor of London, Boris Johnson, and the Minister for London, Tessa Jowell on 29 November 2009. Jowell said that the improvements would be vital to help passenger movement during the London 2012 Olympics.

As of 2022, the tube map has begun referring to the station as King's Cross & St Pancras International.

Ticket halls 

Following completion of the station upgrade in 2010, King's Cross St Pancras has eleven entrances and four ticket halls.
 The "Tube Ticket Hall" in front of King's Cross station was expanded and refurbished in the station upgrade and is signposted as the 'Euston Road' way out from the Tube lines.
 The "Pentonville Road" entrance was the former ticket hall for King's Cross Thameslink station. It has underground passageway connections to the Piccadilly and Victoria lines. It was taken over by London Underground when the Thameslink platforms closed.
 The "Western Ticket Hall" is under the forecourt of St Pancras station adjacent to Euston Road. It opened on 28 May 2006 providing access to St Pancras Station via the St Pancras undercroft.
 The "Northern Ticket Hall" is west of King's Cross station under the concourse of the mainline station. The new ticket hall and its connections to the Tube lines were opened on 29 November 2009. It is signposted as the "Regent's Canal" exit.

Artwork 

The stations along the central part of the Piccadilly line, the Bakerloo line and some sections of the Northern line, were financed by the American entrepreneur Charles Tyson Yerkes, and known for the Leslie Green-designed red station buildings and distinctive platform tiling. Each station was designed with a unique tile pattern and colours.

Like other stations on the line, the Victoria line platforms at the station have a tiled motif in the seat recesses. The design by artist Tom Eckersley features a cross of crowns.

In the 2000s upgrade, Art on the Underground commissioned the first permanent artwork to be installed on the Underground since the 1980s. The stainless steel sculptures, Full Circle by artist Knut Henrik Henriksen, are located at the end of two new concourses on the Northern and Piccadilly lines.

Future proposals

Crossrail 2 
In 1991, a route for a potential Chelsea-Hackney line was safeguarded through the area. This proposal has since evolved into a proposed rail route based on Crossrail called Crossrail 2, which would link both Euston and King's Cross St Pancras, into the station Euston St Pancras.

Docklands Light Railway extension from Bank

Piccadilly line 
In 2005, a business case was prepared to re-open the disused York Road Underground station on the Piccadilly line, to serve the King's Cross Central development and help relieve congestion at King's Cross St Pancras.

Services 
The station is in zone 1 of the London fare system. In addition to the two mainline stations, the station services six underground lines. There are the Circle, Hammersmith & City, Metropolitan (these three share a single pair of tracks), Northern, Piccadilly and Victoria lines. In , King's Cross St Pancras was the  station on the system, with  million passengers entering and exiting the station.

Several London bus routes serve the station, including 17, 30, 46, 63, 73, 91, 205, 214, 259, 390 and 476.

Incidents 
On 2 January 1885, an Irish Nationalist terrorist planted a bomb on the Metropolitan line just west of the station. There were no injuries and little damage as the bomb exploded in the tunnel rather than on any train. James Cunningham was arrested later that month and sentenced to life imprisonment with hard labour for causing the attack.

On 28 May 1959, the leading car on a Northern line train derailed just after leaving King's Cross St Pancras, heading for Euston. There were no injuries.

The 7 July 2005 London bombings were a series of co-ordinated bomb attacks, including an explosion in a Piccadilly line train travelling between King's Cross St Pancras and Russell Square which killed 26 people. The death toll was the highest of all the incidents, as the Piccadilly line is in a deep tube south of King's Cross and there was nowhere for the blast to escape.

References 
Notes

Citations

Sources

External links 

 London Transport Museum photographs:
 
 
 
 
 
 

Circle line (London Underground) stations
Hammersmith & City line stations
Metropolitan line stations
Northern line stations
Piccadilly line stations
Victoria line stations
London Underground Night Tube stations
Proposed Chelsea-Hackney Line stations
Tube stations in the London Borough of Camden
Former Great Northern, Piccadilly and Brompton Railway stations
Railway stations in Great Britain opened in 1906
Former City and South London Railway stations
Railway stations in Great Britain opened in 1907
Railway stations in Great Britain opened in 1941 
Railway stations in Great Britain opened in 1968 
Kings Cross, London
St Pancras, London
Burned buildings and structures in the United Kingdom